Carlos Simeon (born 17 February 2005) is a Seychellois footballer who currently plays for Ware FC and the Seychelles national team.

Club career
Simeon was born in the  La Louise in Plaisance, Seychelles. He and his family moved to the North London, England at age 7. He began playing football at age 11 or 12. As a youth he played for Finchley Revolution before moving to Alexandra Park. He then moved to Hendon where he decided to focus on a career in football. He spent the 2015/2016 season with Hendon's under-18 squad as the team finished fourth in its league. After playing for Hendon's under-16 and under-18 teams, he moved to Tower Hamlets. In 2017 while with the club he competed in a tournament in Portugal against local teams including C.S. Marítimo at age 17. He impressed the Portuguese side enough in the tournament to be offered a spot with the club. 

Following his departure from Marítimo, Simeon returned to England and signed for Ware FC. He scored against Wingate & Finchley in November 2017. In early 2018 he signed for Saint Louis Suns United for his first experience in the Seychelles League. During his stint with the club he went on to make one appearance in 2018 CAF Champions League qualification against Young Africans of Tanzania in addition to league matches.  By May 2018 he had returned to England re-joined Ware FC. By July 2019 Simeon returned to the Seychelles League with Northern Dynamos.

International career
Eligible to represent both England and the Seychelles internationally, Simeon indicated in 2017 that he hoped to represent the Seychelles. Simeone received his first international call-up as part of the Seychelles' senior squad for the 2017 COSAFA Cup. He went on to make his debut in the tournament in a 1–2 loss to Mozambique on 28 June. He returned for the 2018 edition of the tournament and was the Seychelles' only player to play abroad.

International career statistics

References

External links

1998 births
Living people
Association football midfielders
Seychellois footballers
Seychellois expatriate footballers
Seychelles international footballers
Hendon F.C. players
Expatriate footballers in England